Pwllheli Lifeboat Station (based in Pwllheli, Gwynedd, Wales) was first established by the Royal National Lifeboat Institution (RNLI) in 1891 at a cost of £480.  The station currently operates a  all-weather lifeboat and a  lifeboat.

The station was built with doors at both ends which allowed the crew to launch the boat either into the harbour, or over the beach directly into the Sea. Pwllheli received its first motor lifeboat in 1930 and because it was kept afloat, the boathouse went unused until 1953. A D-class inshore lifeboat was first stationed in Pwllheli in 1964. The new station was opened officially in September 2021.

A new station was completed in 2020, thanks to public donations of £83,000 plus the sale of two Ferrari cars bequeathed to the charity in 2015. The new station accommodates the latest Shannon-class all-weather lifeboat.

Fleet

All Weather Boats

Inshore lifeboats

See also
 Royal National Lifeboat Institution

References

External links
 Pwllheli Lifeboat Station Homepage
 RNLI - Pwllheli Lifeboat Station

Lifeboat stations in Wales
Transport in Gwynedd
Buildings and structures in Gwynedd
Pwllheli
Transport infrastructure completed in 1891